East and West Buckland is a civil parish in the English county of Devon.

Forming part of the district of North Devon its main settlements are West Buckland and East Buckland. These were separate civil parishes until their merger on 1 April 1986.

References 

Civil parishes in Devon